The following is a list of episodes for the American-Canadian post-apocalyptic action-drama television series Jeremiah, starring Luke Perry and Malcolm-Jamal Warner that ran on the Showtime network from 2002 to 2004. The series takes place in a future wherein the adult population has been wiped out by a deadly virus.

The series ended production in 2003, after the management of Showtime decided they were not interested in producing science fiction programming anymore. Had the series continued, it would have run under a different showrunner than Straczynski, who decided to leave following the completion of the production of the second season due to creative differences between him and MGM Television. 

Episodes for the final half of the second season did not begin airing in the United States until September 3, 2004.

Series overview

Episodes

Season 1 (2002)

Season 2 (2003–04)

References

External links
 List of Jeremiah episodes at the Internet Movie Database

Lists of American science fiction television series episodes
Lists of Canadian television series episodes